The 2011–12 William & Mary Tribe men's basketball team represented The College of William & Mary during the 2011–12 college basketball season. This was head coach Tony Shaver's ninth season at William & Mary. The Tribe competed in the Colonial Athletic Association and played their home games at Kaplan Arena. They finished the season 6–26, 4–14 in CAA play and lost in the preliminary round of the 2012 CAA men's basketball tournament to Northeastern. They did not participate in any post-season tournaments.

References

William and Mary Tribe
William & Mary Tribe men's basketball seasons
William and Mary Tribe
William and Mary Tribe